The Agricultural Union (HaIhud HaHakla'i) is a settlement movement in Israel for agricultural villages, which includes several moshavim and community settlement. It also has a youth movement founded in 1978.

Member communities

Avtalion
Batzra
Beit Yanai
Beka'ot
Beitan Aharon
Bnei Zion
Dekel
Ein Tamar
Eshbal
Gan HaShomron
Ganot
Givat Shapira
Hadar Am
Hamra
Har Amasa
Havatzelet HaSharon
Herev Le'et
Ilaniya
Kfar Ben Nun
Kfar Mordechai
Kfar Netter
Kfar HaRif
Kisalon
Klahim
Klil
Koranit
Magshimim
Manof
Meishar
Mekhora
Mitzpe Aviv
Neve Ativ
Nir Tzvi
Ro'i
Sde Tzvi
Shavei Tzion
Shdema
Shekhanya
Sho'eva
Talmei Elazar
Talmei Yosef
Udim
Vered Yeriho
Yad HaShmona
Yevul
Yokneam Moshava
Zohar

See also
Agriculture in Israel

External links
Official website 

 
Settlement movements in Israel
Agriculture in Israel
Youth organizations based in Israel